Claudia de Rham is a Swiss theoretical physicist working at the interface of gravity, cosmology and particle physics. She is based at Imperial College London. She was one of the UK finalists in the Physical Sciences and Engineering category of the Blavatnik Award for Young Scientists in 2018 for revitalizing the theory of massive gravity, and won the award in 2020.

Early life and education 
de Rham was born in Lausanne. She completed her undergraduate studies in France, receiving an engineering degree in physics at the École Polytechnique in Paris in 2000. She received a master's degree in Physics from the École Polytechnique Fédérale de Lausanne (EPFL) in 2001. In 2002, de Rham moved to the UK, achieving a PhD in the Department of Applied Mathematics and Theoretical Physics at the University of Cambridge on "braneworld cosmology beyond the low-energy limit".  She has trained as a pilot and made it through several stages of the European Space Agency's astronaut selection process.

Research 
After her PhD, de Rham moved to Montreal to join the Physics Department at McGill University. She moved to McMaster University and the Perimeter Institute for Theoretical Physics in 2006, where she worked in a joint postdoctoral position in Cosmology. In 2010 she joined Geneva University as an Assistant Professor. She moved to Case Western Reserve University in 2011 and became an Associate Professor there in 2016. She joined Imperial College London in 2016. In 2016 she was awarded a £100,000 Wolfson Merit Award from the Royal Society, "Massive Gravity from Cosmology to Condensed Matter Systems".

Her research is in the area of theoretical cosmology, and she explores gravitational models which could explain the accelerated expansion of the Universe. de Rham is recognised as a researcher at the forefront of the development of theories of massive gravity, where the particle carrier of the gravitational force, the graviton, may be massive. In 2010 de Rham constructed a nonlinear theory of massive graviton, which is theoretically consistent and ghost free. The massive gravity is now known as "de Rham-Gabadadze-Tolley (dRGT) theory", owing to the discovery by de Rham, Gregory Gabadadze, and Andrew J. Tolley. Her research helps tackle the problem of the cosmological constant, and could describe the accelerated expansion of the universe as a purely gravitational effect, where massive gravitons are responsible for the so-called dark energy.

In 2015 she gave a TEDx talk titled Nature of the Graviton. She has discussed the underrepresentation of girls in physics with the Ideas Roadshow. She gives regular public lectures about theoretical cosmology.

de Rham has been interviewed by Morgan Freeman in season 8 of Through the Wormhole.

Awards and leadership roles 
2020: Blavatnik Awards for Young Scientists: winner, UK Physical Sciences and Engineering 
 2018: St John's College, Cambridge Adams Prize
 2018: Blavatnik Award for Young Scientists: finalist, UK Physical Sciences and Engineering
 2017: EPFL Alumni Award
 2017–2021: PI on Simons Foundation Award, 'Origins of the Universe' program with Rachel Rosen
 2017–2022: PI on ERC consolidator grant, for the project "Massive Gravity and Cosmology,"
 2016–2021: Royal Society Wolfson Merit Award
 2012–2013: PI on ACES Advance Opportunity Grant, for the project "Recent Developments in Massive Gravity"
 2010–2014: PI on Swiss National Foundation Professorship Grant, for the project "Challenging the cosmological paradigm"

See also
Bimetric gravity

References 

Living people
Swiss cosmologists
21st-century Swiss physicists
Swiss women physicists
Theoretical physicists
1978 births
People from Lausanne
Alumni of the University of Cambridge
École Polytechnique alumni
École Polytechnique Fédérale de Lausanne alumni